is a human resources company headquartered in Japan. It was founded as "Daigaku Shimbun Koukokusha" in 1960 as an advertisement company that specialized in university newspapers. It owns the job search engine Indeed and the employer review site Glassdoor.

It had sales of over 2,269.3 billion Yen in FY2020, with overseas sales contributing 46% of total revenue.

History 

 1960 - The company was founded by Hiromasa Ezoe as an advertising agency specialised in university newspapers called "Daigaku Shimbun Koukokusha" 
 1963/4 - The company changed its name from "Daigaku Shimbun Koukokusha" to "Japan Recruitment Centre Holdings"
 1963/8 - The company changed its name to "Japan Recruit Centre Holdings"
 1984 - The company changed its name to "Recruit Holdings"
 1988 - "The Recruit Scandal": the company has lost its trust and was forced to be put in a difficult situation by the scandal and by the non-performing assets in the group company which was caused by the collapse of Japan's bubble economy.
 1992 - The company became a part of "Daiei Holdings" by transferring the stock holdings to Isao Nakauchi who was the founder of Daiei group.
 2003/3 - The founder Hiromasa Ezoe was convicted guilty of "The Recruit Scandal" by the Tokyo District Court.
 2005/6 - The business of "Recruit Cosmos" was transferred to the Corporate Acquisition Fund Federation.
 2006 - "First finance" which was one of the group company started its dissolution process.
 2006/1 - 11 - The company acquired the ownership of "Sanyo Human Network", "Homepro" and "Yukoyuko".
 2007/2 - The company acquired the ownership of "Job Direct".
 2007/12 - The company acquired the ownership of "Staff Service Holdings"
 2009/3 - The order was made by the Tokyo District Court that the payment of Worker's compensation to be made to the company's former employee for his death from overworking.
 2011/10 - The company acquired US-based Staffmark for US$295 million.
 2012/10 - The company acquired US-based Indeed. First finance changed its name to " Recruit Holdings Co.,Ltd." and changed its corporate logo.
 2014/10 - The company listed on the Tokyo Stock Exchange.
 2015 - Recruit Holdings acquired Treatwell for €180 million.
 2015 - Recruit Holdings acquired Quandoo for US$219 million. 
 2016 - Recruit Holdings acquired USG People for €1.42 billion. 
 2016 - Recruit Holdings acquired Simply Hired, a competitor of Indeed.
 2018/3 - Recruit Holdings Co., Ltd. acquires the Canadian job search website Workopolis.
 2018/5  - Recruit Holdings acquired Glassdoor for US$1.2 billion in cash.
 2020/7 - Recruit Holdings Co., Ltd. Relinquishes its stakeholding in Treatwell

Overview
The company based its core business around job  matchmaking particularly between ready-to-graduate students and corporations in the '60s, further expanding into matchmaking of job change seekers, as well as real estate and rental information in the 1970s. By the end of the 1980s, the company was also engaged in the publication of classified ad magazines covering fields such as part-time job listings, automobile and overseas travel.

In 1988, the company was reported to be engaged in the Recruit scandal, which led to the retirement of founder Hiromasa Ezoe from the company and his shares being sold to Daiei.

After becoming a part of Daiei group, Daiei agreed to keep its stance as a "silent stakeholder" but didn't assume Recruit's debt, which totaled approximately 1,400.2 billion yen.

In June 2012 it was announced that Recruit planned to go public within a year. A holding company was established in October 2012, and it expected to list on either the Tokyo Stock Exchange or another exchange. Following repayment of debt repayment and the purchase of some of the shares held by Daiei, Recruit listed on the First Section of the Tokyo Stock Exchange on October 16, 2014.

The company is currently headquartered in Marunouchi, in Chiyoda, Tokyo.

References

External links

 
Business services companies established in 1963
Japanese companies established in 1963
Book publishing companies in Tokyo
Conglomerate companies established in 1963
Conglomerate companies of Japan
Conglomerate companies based in Tokyo
Entertainment companies established in 1963
Japanese brands
Magazine publishing companies in Tokyo
Mass media companies of Japan
Multinational companies headquartered in Japan
Multinational publishing companies
Newspaper companies of Japan
Service companies based in Tokyo
Companies listed on the Tokyo Stock Exchange
2014 initial public offerings
Internet technology companies of Japan